R. S. Prabhu is an Indian film producer and film director in Malayalam.

Personal life 
He was born to Ramachandra Prabhu and Yasodha on 5 May 1930 in Ernakulam, Kerala, India. He is married to Sarada and he has two children. S. Rajagopal, S. Ramesh.

Filmography 
He started his career as a production manager in Rakthabandham in 1950. After 15 years, in 1965 he produced and directed Rajamalli. He has also acted in Rakthabandham, Moodupadam, Asuravithu.

Rakthabandham (1950) (as production manager and actor)
Moodupadam (1963) (as actor)
Rajamalli (1965) (as producer and director)
Asuravithu (1968) (as actor)

Awards 
Vayalar memorial award in 1997 and Kerala critic film award.

References

External links 
 
 80-ന്റെ നിറവിൽ ആർ.എസ്. പ്രഭു

1950 births
Male actors in Malayalam cinema
Film producers from Kochi
Malayalam film directors
Living people